This is the part 2 of  list of Italian football transfers for the 2010–11 season.

Summer transfer window (August)

Summer transfer window (date unknown)

Out of Window Transfers

References

External links

Italy
2010–11 in Italian football
2010